General elections were held in Tonga on 27 November 2014. All twenty-six elected seats in the single-chamber Legislative Assembly were up for election, although the monarch, acting on the advice of his Prime Minister, retains the possibility to appoint members to Cabinet from outside Parliament, thus granting them a non-elected ex officio seat in Parliament.

They were the second elections carried out under the May 2010 electoral law, which provided that a majority of Assembly members should be elected by the people, rather than the people and the nobility having equal representation. The November 2010 general election was the first held under this new democratic principle; it was also the first to produce a Parliament empowered to give binding advice to the King as to the appointment of a Prime Minister.

Background
In the 2010 general elections, the Democratic Party of the Friendly Islands (DPFI), led by veteran pro-democracy activist ʻAkilisi Pohiva, had won twelve of the people's seventeen seats, with the rest going to independent candidates. (The representatives of the nobility, for their part, never belong to any political party.) Pohiva, the MP for Tongatapu 1, had sought to become Prime Minister, but the nobles and independent people's representatives entrusted Lord Tuʻivakanō with the task of forming a government, relegating the DPFI to the status of a de facto parliamentary opposition.

Considering that the reforms introduced in 2010 were merely to be viewed as a first step in the process of democratisation, the DPFI introduced a  bill in October 2013 (via ʻAisake Eke, MP for Tongatapu 5) which would have empowered the people to elect the Prime Minister directly from among the twenty-six elected members of Parliament, instead of the King appointing a Prime Minister from among those members on the advice of Parliament. The bill was rejected by fifteen votes to six, failing even to secure the support of all DPFI members.

Nonetheless, Pohiva immediately announced that, in early 2014, his party would submit a bill for electoral reform, so that all twenty-six members  of the Assembly be elected by the people. The nobility would still retain their existing nine seats, but those nobles would be elected by the people. Pohiva suggested this would make "the whole Parliament [...] accountable to the people and not as we have it now". Dr Malakai Koloamatangi of Massey University commented that it was probably too late for any such reform to apply to the 2014 election.

Electoral system
Under the electoral reforms introduced prior to the 2010 election, Tonga is divided into seventeen single-member constituencies for the election of the people's representatives. These overlap with the four constituencies for the election of the nobles' representatives: a four-member constituency covering Tongatapu and ʻEua, a two-member constituency covering Vavaʻu, a two-member constituency covering Haʻapai, and a single-member constituency covering the islands of Niuafoʻou and Niuatoputapu. In both types of constituency, the first-past-the-post electoral system is applied.

All Tongan citizens aged at least 21, other than noble title holders and members of the Royal Family who hold noble titles, are entitled to elect the people's representative for their constituency. "Persons under summons for debt" and those diagnosed as insane are excluded from the right to vote. As for the nobles' constituencies, the right to vote is granted to hereditary peers and life peers, although only hereditary peers are entitled to be elected. There are thirty-three titles of hereditary nobility, which can be inherited only by men, and which entitle the bearer to the title of "Lord". Some of these titles are periodically vacant, and some are held by members of the Royal Family. As of 2013, eight commoners (all of them men) had been elevated by the monarchy to a life peerage, which likewise entitled them to the title of "Lord".

Results

By constituency

Nobles

References

Tonga
Elections in Tonga
2014 in Tonga
November 2014 events in Oceania